Half crown may refer to:

 Half crown (British coin), a pre-decimalisation coin of the United Kingdom
 Half crown (Irish coin), a pre-decimalisation coin of Ireland

See also
 Half a Crown (novel)